Advolly Richmond (born 1966) is a garden writer, historian and a television presenter, who regularly appears on BBC Gardener's World.

Career 
Richmond formerly worked in the automobile industry, before choosing to retrain in horticulture. She is a graduate of the Work and Retrain As a Gardener Scheme (WRAG) which was developed by the Women's Farm and Garden Association. After completing her traineeship, she studied for and was awarded an MA in Garden History from the University of Bristol. She also studied for the Royal Horticultural Society Certificate in Horticulture, prior to her WRAG role.

Richmond is a presenter on BBC Gardener's World, where she presents regular sections on garden history. She has worked on the life of Reverend Thomas Birch Freeman and his influence on horticulture in the nineteenth century. She has also worked on the gardens of Capability Brown, the Botanic Garden in Harare and nineteenth-century African botanical stations. She has spoken out about her experiences of racism in horticulture.

Eponym 
Richmond has a variety of snowdrop named after her.

Awards 

 Alan Titchmarsh New Talent Award (finalist) - Garden Media Guild Awards 2020.

References

External links 

 Advolly Richmond on Renaissance Garden Rooms and a history of how Garden-Sharing started in Britain.

Living people
1966 births
Alumni of the University of Bristol
Garden writers
21st-century British historians
British women historians
Black British women
Black British writers
British television presenters